The 2017–18 Southern Jaguars basketball team represented Southern University during the 2017–18 NCAA Division I men's basketball season. The Jaguars, led by interim head coach Morris Scott, played their home games at the F. G. Clark Center in Baton Rouge, Louisiana as members of the Southwestern Athletic Conference. They finished the season 15–18, 10–8 in SWAC play to finish in fifth place. Due to Grambling State's Academic Progress Rate violations and subsequent postseason ineligibility, the Jaguars received the No. 4 seed in the SWAC tournament. They defeated Jackson State in the quarterfinals before losing to Arkansas–Pine Bluff in  the semifinals.

On April 12, 2018, Southern hired Stetson assistant coach and former Morehead State/Mississippi Valley State head coach Sean Woods for the full-time job.

Previous season
The Jaguars finished the 2016–17 season 15–18, 10–8 in SWAC play to finish in a four-way tie for third place. As the 3-seed in the SWAC tournament they defeated Jackson State before losing in the semifinals to Alcorn State.

On March 31, head coach Roman Banks, who had been serving as Southern's interim Athletic Director for almost two years, was promoted to full-time Athletic Director and stepped down as basketball coach. He finished his coaching career at Southern with a six-year record of 114–85. Assistant coach Morris Scott was named interim head coach.

Roster

Schedule and results

|-
!colspan=9 style=| Non-conference regular season

|-
!colspan=9 style=| SWAC regular season

|-
!colspan=9 style=| SWAC tournament

Source

References

Southern Jaguars basketball seasons
Southern
South
South